Regnellidium is a monotypic genus of ferns of family Marsileaceae.

The single living species, Regnellidium diphyllum, the two-leaf water fern, is native to southeastern Brazil and adjacent regions of Argentina. It resembles its relatives from the genus Marsilea, but has 2-lobed leaves (rather than 4).  This fern is sometimes grown in aquaria.

A fossil assigned to the species Regnellidium upatoiensis has been found in Cretaceous deposits of the eastern United States.

The genus name of Regnellidium is in honour of Anders Fredrik Regnell (1807–1884), a Swedish physician and botanist.
It was first described and published in Ark. Bot. Vol.3 (Issue 6) on page 2 in 1904.

References

Other sources
Mabberley, D. J.  (1997). The Plant-Book. Cambridge University Press.

Salviniales
Flora of Brazil
Monotypic fern genera
Plants described in 1904